Valcour Records is an independent record label based in Eunice, Louisiana. Valcour was founded in 2006 by  Joel Savoy (son of Marc and Ann Savoy), with friends Phillip LaFargue II and Lucius Fontenot. Valcour Records' first release in 2006 was Goin' Down to Louisiana by fiddle player Cedric Watson and accordionist Corey Ledet.

Valcour has since released albums with Louisiana bands such as the Figs, Bonsoir Catin, GIVERS, and Feufollet. Through the Cajun and Creole [drinking songs compilation Allons Boire un Coup (2007), the label has also featured the Pine Leaf Boys, Ann Savoy, Steve Riley and Racines, The Red Stick Ramblers, the Lost Bayou Ramblers, and Balfa heir Courtney Granger.

In 2007, Valcour partnered with independent distributor Select-O-Hits for nationwide distribution.

See also 
 List of record labels
 Music of Louisiana
 Cajun Music
 List of people related to Cajun music
 History of Cajun music
 Louisiana

References

External links
 Official site
 The Cajun Swamp Fire Of Feufollet: NPR Music
 offBeat Magazine Best of the Beat Awards (New Orleans)

American independent record labels
Indie rock record labels
Record labels based in Louisiana